Vuorela is a Finnish surname. Notable people with the name include:

Einari Vuorela (1899–1972), Finnish writer
Ulla Vuorela (1945–2011), Finnish professor of social anthropology
Seita Vuorela (1971–2015), Finnish author of young adult novels and photographer
 

Finnish-language surnames